Mordellistena humeralis is a species of beetle in the genus Mordellistena of the family Mordellidae, in the superfamily Tenebrionoidea. It was described in 1758 by Carl Linnaeus.

References

humeralis
Beetles described in 1758
Taxa named by Carl Linnaeus
Articles containing video clips